Clannad: Christ Church Cathedral is a live album by Irish folk group Clannad which was released in 2012. The album and DVD features Riverdance singer Brian Kennedy and Irish choral group Anúna.

Track listing
 "Thíos Cois na Trá Domh"
 "'dTigeas a Damhsa?"
 "Crann Úll"
 "Na Buachaillí Álainn"
 "Eleanor Plunkett"
 "'Mháire Bhruineall"
 "Buachaill Ón Éirne"
 "Newgrange"
 "Éirigh 's Cuir Ort do Chuid Éadaigh"
 "'Mhorag 's na Horo Gheallaidh"
 "Robin of Sherwood"
 "Caisleán Óir"
 "In a Lifetime"
 "I Will Find You"
 "Theme from Harry's Game"
 "Dúlamán"
 "Down by the Salley Gardens"
 "Níl Sé Ina Lá"
 "Teidhir Abhaile Riú"

Personnel

Clannad
Clannad – Arranger, Main Performer
Moya Brennan – Harp, Vocals
Ciarán Brennan – Acoustic Guitar, Bass, Vocals, Keyboard, Arranger
Pádraig Duggan – Acoustic Guitar, Mandolin, Vocals
Noel Duggan – Acoustic Guitar, Vocals
Pól Brennan - guitar, whistles, vocals

Other musicians
 Brian Kennedy - vocals
 Anúna - choir
 Máire Breatnach - fiddle, viola, backing vocals
 Sinéad Madden - fiddle, backing vocals
 Jane Hughes - cello
 Robbie Harris - percussion
 Eamon de Barra - keyboards
 Ian Parker - additional instrumentation
 Liam Bradley - additional instrumentation

Production
 Liam McCarthy - lighting designer
 Andy Knightly - audio recording
 Ben Findlay - mixer
 Elaine McGuinnes - camera assistants
 Jason Keane - camera assistants
 Máirín Seoighe - production coordinator
 Joe Hoey - camera
 Kevin Cantrell - camera
 Michael O'Donovan - camera
 Fionn Mac Gilla Cuda - jib operator
 Áine Furlong - editor
 Grant Gravitt Jr. - editor
 Cathal Waters - producer / director
 Shane McDonnell - co-producer
 John Scher - executive producers
 Keith Naisbitt - executive producers
 Gustavo Sagastume - executive producers
 Carole Myers - executive producers

Tour crew
 Paddy McPoland - Tour Manager
 Paul Ashe Brown - FOH Audio
 Leon Brennan - Personnel Manager
 Oisín Murray - Stage Manager/Backline Tech
 Colin Sheehy - Backline Tech
 Trevor McKenna - Location Sound
 Ross Carew - Location Sound

Clannad albums
2012 live albums